The 1978 Oregon Ducks football team represented the University of Oregon in the Pacific-10 Conference (Pac-10) during the 1978 NCAA Division I-A football season.  The Ducks compiled a 2–9 record (2–5 against Pac-10 opponents), finished eighth in the Pac-10, and were outscored

Schedule

Roster

References
 McCann, Michael C. (1995). Oregon Ducks Football: 100 Years of Glory. Eugene, Oregon: McCann Communications Corp. .

Oregon
Oregon Ducks football seasons
Oregon Ducks football